John Michie (born 25 October 1956) is a Scottish television and film actor, known for his roles as DI Robbie Ross in the STV detective drama series Taggart, as Karl Munro in Coronation Street from 2011–2013 and his role as CEO Guy Self in Casualty and Holby City.

Early life
Michie was born in Burma and boarded at Windlesham House School while his family were based in Kenya. The family later settled in Edinburgh, where was sent to study at Glenalmond College from the age of twelve. At the age of nineteen, he worked his passage to Australia on a cargo ship, where he spent a year as a jackaroo herding cattle before returning to Scotland. He took a job as a stagehand at the Traverse Theatre in Edinburgh, where his interest in acting started. He returned to Kenya when he was 22, beginning his acting career in A Private Matter at the Donovan Maule Theatre, Nairobi in 1980.

Career

Television
He was also in Taggart series 5 1989.
Michie appeared in Moon and Son in 1992. He then had a role in The Ruth Rendell Mysteries in 1994, co-starring with Colin Firth. He played a pet shop owner, in the two-part episode "Master of the Moor".

In 1998, he was given a regular part in Taggart, playing DI Robbie Ross, a dedicated detective not afraid to go about things his own way and fly in the face of authority when he needs to.

From 2011 to 2013, Michie played Karl Munro in Coronation Street. His character was the partner of Stella Price (Michelle Collins). Since leaving Coronation Street, Michie has played a regular role in hospital drama Holby City, playing Guy Self and while continuing the role in 2014, he has also appeared in its sister show Casualty. Michie left Holby City in November 2016 after Guy handed in his resignation but he returned in August 2017. It was announced in the autumn trailer that Guy will return during the 20th series.
 

In 2022 Michie played Detective Chief Superintendent Jack Mulgrew in series 3 of the BBC police drama London Kills.

Michie is the voice behind Windfall Films’ Big, Bigger, Biggest and Monster Moves series for Five (TV channel). Big, Bigger, Biggest explores the engineering marvel of large buildings and sky scrapers, while Monster Moves documents the most daring and dangerous relocation projects ever attempted. Other voice over work has included Channel 4’s The Gunpowder Plot, and six titles in the series Football Stories.

Presenting
Michie has become increasingly involved in the factual production sector. His first presenting role was for the one-hour documentary Murder Capital, which was produced by STV for The Crime & Investigation Network. It was during filming of Murder Capital that Michie met STV producer Mick McAvoy and together they developed the idea for Michie’s next series Highlands. This six-part historical documentary series focused on the Highland Clearances of the late 18th and 19th centuries. Michie's most recent presenting work was for STV’s Made in Scotland for which he is also executive producer. This documentary series examines the symbols of Scotland. The final episode saw him unveil a newly designed Michie Tartan.

Films
Michie's first film role was in the 1989 film The Conquest of the South Pole but his first leading role came in the film adaptation, Monk Dawson in 1998. Based on the Piers Paul Read novel, it gained a good reception from the critics despite only a short run at the UK box office. Michie played the character David Baird in John Madden’s 1996 film Truth or Dare starring Helen Baxendale and John Hannah.

In 1999, Michie starred alongside Richard Harris in To Walk with Lions, a film based on the life of George Adamson which featured Michie back in his childhood home of Kenya playing the wildlife conservationist Tony Fitzjohn.

Stage

Michie began his acting career on the stage and has appeared in several West End productions. Past roles include playing Arthur in Jean Anouilh’s comedy, Number One, at the Queen's Theatre in 1984. He also played John in Noël Coward’s play, Easy Virtue, at the Garrick Theatre in 1988–1989, before going on to play Walker in Andrew Davies’ Prin at the Lyric Theatre, 1989–1990, directed by actor/director Richard Wilson. Michie was directed by Wilson twice more in Michael Wall's Women Laughing at the Royal Court Theatre and in Simply Disconnected at the Chichester Festival Theatre in 1996. He played Danny in Breed, a new play from emerging playwright Lou Ramsden, staged at Theatre503 in 2010.

Politics
In 2008, Michie publicly backed the Scottish Labour Party in the run up to the Glasgow East by-election. However it later emerged Michie, in a report for the BBC's This Week programme the previous year, appeared to back Scottish independence, which the Labour Party officially opposes. Michie said, "An independent Scotland would find a new confidence. It would slow down the brain-drain that causes this country to lose so many of its most brightest and most skilled." The Labour Party subsequently issued a statement on behalf of Michie claiming he did not support independence.

In August 2014, Michie was one of 200 public figures who were signatories to a letter to The Guardian opposing Scottish independence in the run-up to September's referendum on that issue.

Personal life
Michie has three children with his partner Carol Fletcher, a former Hot Gossip dancer. He is a keen swimmer and player of squash. His nephew is actor Jamie Michie, who has appeared in The IT Crowd, Game of Thrones and alongside John in one episode of Taggart in 2010.

In September 2017, his 24-year-old daughter, Louella Fletcher-Michie, died at the Bestival music festival in Dorset after taking the recreational drug 2C-P. Her 28-year-old boyfriend, Ceon Broughton – who had videoed her over a period of six hours hallucinating and begging for help, and failed to take her to the festival hospital tent only 400 metres away – was subsequently arrested on suspicion of murder and questioned by police. In February 2019 Broughton appeared at Winchester Crown Court charged with manslaughter. On 28 February 2019, he was found guilty of manslaughter by gross negligence, as well as supplying a Class A drug, and sentenced to eight and a half years in prison. His manslaughter conviction was quashed on 18 August 2020 after Court of Appeal judges ruled that Fletcher-Michie's death had been a tragic accident, but the conviction for supplying a Class A drug stood.

Television

Stage

Peter Pan (2018) played Captain Hook at the Waterside Theatre, Aylesbury
Breed (2010) played lead role of Danny at Theatre503 – nominated for an Offie award
Simply Disconnected (1996) played Greg at the Chichester Festival Theatre
Bent played Rudy
Ghosts played Oswald
The Winslow Boy played Dickie
Dangerous Corner played Gordon
Equus played Alan
Black Comedy played Brindsley
Kes played McDowall
Richard III played Hastings.
The Russian Revolution played Trotsky at Riverside Studios

Number One Queens Theatre (1984) played Arthur
Easy Virtue The Garrick Theatre (1988–1989) played John.
Prin The Lyric Theatre (1989–1990) played Walker
Women Laughing Royal Court Upstairs
The Cherry Orchard National Tour (1994)
Dealing with Claire Orange Tree, Richmond with Tom Courtney
The Impresario From Smyrna (1994) Old Red Lion, London
House New Grove Directed by Martin Clunes
Measure for Measure (1990) Played The Duke in an Oxford Playhouse Production
Don Juan played Don Juan in an Oxford Playhouse Production
Private Matter (1980) Donvan Maule Theatre, Nairobi

Films

The Race (2004) played Father Pat.  Short Film
Storm, short film (2001) played Colonel Pine.
Puckoon (2002) played Colonel Charrington Thurk
Being Considered (2000) short film, plays Frank.
To Walk with Lions (1999) played Tony Fitzjohn. Co. Lead

Monk Dawson (1998) played Father John Dawson. Lead Role
Daphne & Apollo (1997)
Truth or Dare (1996) played David Baird
Conquest of the South Pole (1989) played Roddy, directed by Gillies MacKinnon
A Passage to India (1984)

Presenting

Murder Capital (2007)
Highlands (2008)
Made in Scotland (2009)

Voice over

"How Things Work" (Quest) (2016)
"London Underground Revealed" (National Geographic) (2011)
Big, Bigger, Biggest (Five) (2008)
Monster Moves (Five) (2008)
Jock Stein (BBC) (2007)
Football Stories (Channel 4) (2006)
Bay City Rollers (Granada) (2004)
The Gunpowder Plot (Channel 4) (2002
Black Watch (BBC Scotland) (1997)
The Glencoe Massacre (BBC Scotland)
Kelvingrove Museum (BBC Scotland)

Test Pilots (Creation Company Films)
Amazon Abyss (BBC Bristol)
Megamoves (FIVE)
In Search of Speed (IWC)
Guide to Euro 2004 (TWI)
Althrop: After Diana & Superstar on Trial (BBC)
Art Crimes & South Sea Bubble (Wall To Wall)
Volcano That Blew The World Away
Confessions of a Spin Doctor (STV)
Swamp Tigers (Cicada)
Big Bigger Biggest
"The Loch Ness Monster Revealed" (Discovery Communications 2008)
"Building the Biggest Cruise Ship" (National Geographic)

References

External links
 John Michie at the British Film Institute
 

Living people
1956 births
20th-century Scottish male actors
21st-century Scottish male actors
Scottish male television actors
Scottish male film actors
Scottish male soap opera actors
Male actors from Edinburgh
People educated at Glenalmond College
People educated at Windlesham House School